Laura Isabel Gómez Quintero, also simply known as Laura Gómez (born 17 July 1990), is a Colombian female speed skater who was a professional roller skater during her early career. She took the sport of speed skating only in late July 2017 and broke several Colombian national records for women within six months after engaging in speed skating before impressing the selectors to name herself at the 2018 Winter Olympics. She competed in the women's 3000m mass start event.  

Laura Gómez was informed about her selection to the Colombian squad for the 2018 Winter Olympics, just a week prior to the start of the Winter Olympics. It was only the second appearance for Colombia at the Winter Olympics which sent a delegation of 4 participants in the multi-sport event and she was also the only Colombian woman competitor to compete during the 2018 Winter Olympics. During the 2018 Winter Olympics, she broke a national Olympic record for 1000m speed skating event for women during a test competition.

In December 2021, Gómez qualified for her second Winter Olympics in 2022.

National records 
She holds 5 national records in speed skating. (500m, 1000m, 1500m, 3000m, and 5000m)

References 

1990 births
Living people
Colombian female speed skaters
Speed skaters at the 2018 Winter Olympics
Speed skaters at the 2022 Winter Olympics
Olympic speed skaters of Colombia
Sportspeople from Antioquia Department
20th-century Colombian women
21st-century Colombian women